The Common Gaming Houses Act 1953, is a Malaysian law which made illegal common gaming houses, public gaming, and public lotteries. All common gaming houses were declared a nuisance and prohibited by law, and any person found owning an establishment or participating can be charged. Prosecution charging under this Act only need to establish that a game was played in the establishment without having to prove what specific game was played.

Structure
The Common Gaming Houses Act 1953, in its current form (1 January 2006), consists of 28 sections and 3 schedules (including 12 amendments), without separate Part.
Section 1: Short title
Section 2: Interpretation
Section 3: Nuisance
Section 3A: Specific game need not be stated or proved
Section 4: Offences relating to common gaming houses
Section 4A: Assisting in carrying on a public lottery, etc.
Section 4B: Offences relating to dealing in gaming machines
Section 5: Advancing or furnishing money for establishing or conducting
Section 6: Gaming in common gaming house
Section 7: Gaming in public
Section 8: Instigating, promoting, or facilitating gaming in public
Section 9: Buying lottery ticket
Section 10: Money paid recoverable
Section 11: Presumption against person selling lottery tickets, etc.
Section 12: Sales of lottery tickets void
Section 13: Responsibility of employers and overseers
Section 14: Arrest by employer
Section 15: Power to enter on premises
Section 15A: Closure of premises
Section 16: Search warrant against premises
Section 16A: Forfeiture of seized gaming machines
Section 17: Search warrant against persons
Section 18: Entry and search by Magistrate or senior police officer
Section 19: Presumption against house and occupier
Section 20: Presumption against house, occupier and owner
Section 20A: Liability of office-bearers, etc.
Section 21: Order for demolition of structural contrivances for facilitating gaming
Section 21A: Disconnection of supply of energy
Section 22: Protection of informers
Section 22A: Protection of officers, etc.
Section 23: Offenders as witnesses for prosecution
Section 23A: Agent to secure evidence
Section 24: Trial
Section 25: Binding over on second conviction
Section 26: Reward to informer
Section 27: Saving
Section 27A: Power to license promotion and organization of gaming by a company
Section 28: Repeal
 Schedules

References

External links
 Common Gaming Houses Act 1953 

1953 in Malaya
Legal history of British Malaya
1953 in law
Malaysian federal legislation